Minihan is a family name with Irish origin and may refer to:

Gary Minihan, retired Australian sprinter
Jeremiah Francis Minihan (1903–1973), American prelate of the Roman Catholic Church
John Minihan (photographer), Irish photographer
John Minihan (politician), Irish politician
Kenneth Minihan, former director of the United States National Security Agency and the Defense Intelligence Agency
Sam Minihan professional footballer

See also
Monaghan (disambiguation)
Monahan
Moynahan
Moynihan (surname)